Ramiro Viáfara (born 13 February 1947) is a Colombian footballer. He competed in the men's tournament at the 1968 Summer Olympics.

References

External links

1947 births
Living people
Colombian footballers
Colombia international footballers
Olympic footballers of Colombia
Footballers at the 1968 Summer Olympics
Association football midfielders
Independiente Santa Fe footballers
Deportivo Cali footballers
Independiente Medellín footballers
Colombian football managers